Carl Georg Lucas Christian Bergmann (18 May 1814 – 30 April 1865) was a German anatomist, physiologist and biologist who developed Bergmann's rule relating population sizes to ambient temperature.

Biography 
In 1838 Bergmann received his medical doctorate at the University of Göttingen, and later on, served as Obermedicinalrath and as a professor of anatomy and physiology at the University of Rostock. He produced a series of  papers between 1839 and 1862 on comparative anatomy in Johannes Peter Müller's Archiv für Anatomie, Physiologie und wissenschaftliche Medicin.

He obtained his habilitation at the University of Göttingen and was named an associate professor in 1843. From October 1852 he was a full professor and a member of the Medicinal Commission in Rostock. In 1861 he was appointed Obermedicinalrath. He died in Geneva on 30 April 1865, following his return from Menton, where he had resided for the winter because of his deteriorating health.

Publications 
 Bergmann, C. (1846). Lehrbuch der Medicina Forensis für Juristen. Friedrich Vieweg und Sohn, Braunschweig
 Bergmann, C. (1848). Über die Verhältnisse der Wärmeökonomie der Thiere zu ihrer Grösse . Vandenhoeck und Ruprecht, Göttingen.
 Bergmann, C. and R. Leuckart (1855). Anatomisch-physiologische Uebersicht des Thierreichs. Vergleichende Anatomie und Physiologie. J. B. Müller, Stuttgart.

References 

1814 births
1865 deaths
German anatomists
19th-century German biologists
German physiologists
Academic staff of the University of Rostock
University of Göttingen alumni
Scientists from Göttingen
Members of the Göttingen Academy of Sciences and Humanities